IBM i series may refer to:

IBM ThinkPad i series — laptop line (1998–2002)
IBM eServer iSeries — server line (2000-2004)

Also may refer to IBM i Operating system (2008-current).